The New Century Network is a defunct news aggregator that was run by a consortium of newspaper companies.  The company launched in 1995 during the time when Internet first started to enter the public consciousness, and ceased operations in March 1998.

History
New Century Networks was formed in 1995 as a collaborative effort among the major newspaper companies to aggregate their content.  The forming companies, Knight-Ridder, Tribune Company, Times Mirror, Advance Publications, Cox Enterprises, Gannett Company, Hearst Corporation, The Washington Post Company, and The New York Times Company each contributed $1 million to fund the company.  Lee de Boer was appointed as CEO.

Over its 3-year life, the nine member companies reportedly poured $25 million into the venture.   Leadership and management was confused, as the participating companies had different ideas about the best direction for the company; Tribune Co. became so exasperated at NCN that they joined America Online in offering a classified service with them.  Small papers worried of neglect and lack of power in the organization, and large papers feared it would take away page views from them if it became too popular.  As a result, official links to New Century Networks were often small and hidden at the member newspapers.

In February 1998, New Century Networks shut down NewsWorks, its main news aggregation website, and laid off a third of its staff.  It changed itself to a search engine of the major affiliated newspapers instead, and moved to reorient its purpose toward advertising.  Instead, two weeks later, the board of directors voted to close the company entirely.

References and links

 New Media Meltdown at New Century
 New Century Network Shuttered; 40 Lose Jobs
 5 Ways Newspapers Botched the Web
 That Sinking Feeling, CIO Web Business, Nov. 1998.
 New Century Network: A Critical Moment for Newspapers at the Dawn of the Internet

Companies established in 1995
Defunct websites
American news websites
Companies disestablished in 1998